The Flamingo Road Tour (commonly acknowledged as the Flamingo Tour) was the 2010 solo concert tour by American recording artist, Brandon Flowers, who is the lead vocalist for the rock band, The Killers. Visiting North America and Europe, the tour supported his debut album, Flamingo. The tour has received praise from both spectators and critics alike, including being named one of the "Best Shows of the Summer" and "'Must See Fall Tours" by Spin.

Background
After a European run, Flowers returned to the US in November for a national tour in 2,000-seat theaters.  Tickets went on sale during the second week of September.

Shortly after announcing his band would take a brief hiatus, Flowers began to record his first solo record. After his first single "Crossfire" gained momentum, Flowers announced a short club tour to help promote his forthcoming album. The tour received high praise from many critics and was expanded into a full length tour into Europe and North America. The namesake of the tour derives from the iconic Flamingo Road in Flowers hometown of Las Vegas—where he worked as a bellhop at the historic Flamingo Las Vegas. He mentions, "A lot of my life took place on Flamingo [Road]. It's part of Vegas mythology, and now it's part of my own mythology […] That's my 'hood.'" Flower's band, The Killers paid tribute to Las Vegas with their second album, Sam's Town, named for Sam's Town Hotel and Gambling Hall.

Opening acts
Fran Healy (North America—Leg 2)
Transfer (North America—Leg 3)

Setlist

Additional notes
During the concert at the Hammerstein Ballroom in New York City, New York, Flowers performed "Read My Mind" and "Mr. Brightside" in lieu of "The Clock Was Tickin'" and "When You Were Young". Additionally, "Only the Young" was performed during the encore.
During the concert at the O2 Academy in Liverpool, England, Flowers performed "Helter Skelter" by The Beatles during the encore instead of "The Clock Was Tickin'" which was played on every other UK Date (Except London)
During the concert at the O2 Academy Brixton in London, England, Flowers performed "Only the Young", "Human", and "Mr. Brightside" during the encore alongside Stuart Price.
During the concert at The Wiltern Theater in Los Angeles, California, Flowers performed "Roxanne" alongside Andy Summers during the encore.
During the concert at the Fox Oakland Theater in Oakland, California, Flowers performed "Side" alongside Fran Healy during the encore.
During the concert at The Stone Pony in Asbury Park, New Jersey, Flowers performed "Promised Land" by Bruce Springsteen during the encore.
During the concert at Where The Action Is in Gothenburg, Sweden, Flowers performed "Reptile" by The Church.
During the concert at the Coachella Festival in Indio, California, Flowers performed "Read My Mind" and "Mr. Brightside" alongside Dave Keuning and Mark Stoermer from The Killers.

Tour dates

Festivals and other miscellaneous performances
This performance was a part of Arthur's Day.

Box office score data

References

External links
Brandon Flowers' Official Website

2010 concert tours
Brandon Flowers concert tours